Robert Oliver Fouts (December 19, 1921 – July 7, 2019) was an American sportscaster who was best known for his work as a play-by-play announcer for San Francisco 49ers football.

Biography
Bob worked with Lon Simmons on radio and television broadcasts for the 49ers in the 1950s. He also called basketball games for the Saint Mary's Gaels and other schools and covered ice hockey, golf, Pacific Coast League San Francisco Seals, track-and-field, and even wrestling. Fouts was elected into the Bay Area Radio Hall of Fame in 2008. He also covered the Olympic Games and served as sports anchor for KPIX-TV and KGO-TV and called games for the San Francisco Warriors.

Personal
Bob attended Christian Brothers High School and St. Mary's College of California and then went to serve in the U.S. Army Air Forces during World War II. He resided with his wife in San Francisco and had five children, one of whom, Dan Fouts, went on to become a Pro Football Hall of Fame quarterback and football broadcaster.

References

External links
Bob Fouts – KSFO/49ers Promotional Photo – Circa 1958

Celebrating The Bay Area Radio Hall of Fame – Class of 2008!

1921 births
2019 deaths
American radio sports announcers
American television sports announcers
College basketball announcers in the United States
Golden State Warriors announcers
Golf writers and broadcasters
Ice hockey commentators
Minor League Baseball broadcasters
National Basketball Association broadcasters
National Football League announcers
Olympic Games broadcasters
People from Sacramento, California
Saint Mary's College of California alumni
San Francisco 49ers announcers
Track and field broadcasters
United States Army Air Forces personnel of World War II